Khatti Meethi Zindagi is a Hum TV comedy drama which was aired from 26 July 2011 to 12 September 2011 starring Fahad Mustafa and Eshita Mehboob in lead roles.

Cast
 Fahad Mustafa as Babar
 Eshita Mehboob
 Waseem Abbas
 Ayesha Alam
 Amber Nausheen
 Hira Tareen
 Umer Isa
 Adil Wadia
 Khalid Malik
 Afshan
 Sana Dawar
 Zubair Zakria
 Hamid
 Khoobsurat
 Agha Shiraz

References

2011 Pakistani television series debuts
2011 Pakistani television series endings
Pakistani drama television series
Urdu-language television shows
Hum TV original programming